Předměřice is name of several places in the Czech Republic:

Předměřice nad Jizerou, a municipality and village in the Central Bohemian Region
Předměřice nad Labem, a municipality and village in the Hradec Králové Region